Terry Poole (born February 27, 1992) is an American football offensive tackle for the New Jersey Generals of the United States Football League (USFL). He played college football at San Diego State and Monterey Peninsula College.

Professional career

Seattle Seahawks
Poole was drafted by the Seattle Seahawks in the fourth round with the 130th pick in the 2015 NFL Draft. Poole was released on September 5, 2015 and was signed to the practice squad the next day.

On September 3, 2016, he was waived/injured by the Seahawks and placed on injured reserve. He was released on October 3, 2016.

Miami Dolphins
On October 11, 2016, Poole was signed to the Miami Dolphins' practice squad. He signed a reserve/future contract with the Dolphins on January 10, 2017. He was waived on August 5, 2017.

Houston Texans
Poole was claimed off waivers by the Houston Texans on August 6, 2017, but was waived two days later after failing his physical.

San Diego Fleet
On August 16, 2018, Poole signed with the San Diego Fleet of the Alliance of American Football. He was one of seven San Diego State alumni to make the team's final 52-man roster. The league ceased operations in April 2019.

Houston Roughnecks
Poole was drafted in the 2020 XFL Draft by the Houston Roughnecks. He had his contract terminated when the league suspended operations on April 10, 2020.

Winnipeg Blue Bombers
Poole signed with the Winnipeg Blue Bombers of the CFL on June 25, 2021.

Toronto Argonauts
On July 19, 2021, Poole was traded to the Toronto Argonauts in exchange for defensive back Alden Darby.

New Jersey Generals
Poole was selected in the seventh round of the 2022 USFL Draft by the New Jersey Generals.

The San Antonio Brahmas selected Poole in the third round of the 2023 XFL Supplemental Draft on January 1, 2023, but he instead re-signed with the Generals on January 11.

References

External links
 San Diego State Aztecs bio

1992 births
Living people
People from Seaside, California
Players of American football from California
American football offensive tackles
Monterey Peninsula Lobos football players
San Diego State Aztecs football players
Seattle Seahawks players
Miami Dolphins players
Houston Texans players
San Diego Fleet players
Houston Roughnecks players
Winnipeg Blue Bombers players
Toronto Argonauts players
New Jersey Generals (2022) players